ICP may refer to:

Business
 ICP srl, Italian manufacturer of automotive equipment and kit aircraft
Ideal customer profile: see Qualified prospect
 International Comfort Products Corporation, US air conditioning and heating company
 Indonesian Crude Price
 Imperial College Press, UK

Computing and technology
 Internet Cache Protocol, for coordinating web caches
 Integrated circuit piezoelectric sensor, force sensor
 Iterative closest point, an algorithm used to minimize the difference between two clouds of points
 ICP license (Internet Content Provider license), for Chinese Web sites
 Initial Connection Protocol, of the ARPANET Network Control Program
 International Cataloguing Principles, revision of Paris Principles on bibliographical cataloging standards for libraries

Education
 Institut Catholique de Paris
 International Center of Photography, New York City
 Disney International College Program

Medical
 Infantile cerebral palsy
 Intracranial pressure inside the skull
 Intrahepatic cholestasis of pregnancy

Music
 Instant Composers Pool, a Dutch free jazz musical cooperative
 Insane Clown Posse, an American hip hop duo

Organizations
 International Communist Party
 International Comparison Program
 Iraqi Communist Party, founded in 1934, Iraq
 Indochinese Communist Party, 1930–1945, a predecessor of the Communist Party of Vietnam
 Immigration Control Platform, Irish organization
 Instituto de Cultura Puertorriqueña, a government agency in Puerto Rico
 Institute for Conflict Transformation and Peacebuilding, a Swiss non-governmental organization
 International Center of Photography, a museum for photography and visual culture in Manhattan, New York; which also offers an array of educational courses and programming.

Science
 Inductively coupled plasma in physics
 Instituto Clodomiro Picado of the University of Costa Rica
 Intrinsically conducting polymer
 Interval Constraint Propagation in numerical mathematics
 Immune checkpoint in immunology